Irazú is a volcano.

Irazu may also refer to:
 Irazú (satellite)
 Irazu Costa Rica Restaurant, a restaurant in Chicago, Illinois